Gurbani Judge, better known as VJ Bani and also Bani J, is an Indian fitness model, actress and a former MTV India presenter. She is known for participating in MTV Roadies 4, Fear Factor: Khatron Ke Khiladi 4 and Bigg Boss 10.

Career
Judge started her career by competing in the reality show MTV Roadies 4 where she was the 1st runner-up. She continued her collaboration with MTV Roadies 5. She was also a contestant on Fear Factor: Khatron Ke Khiladi 4. Apart from her work on MTV, Bani also extended her performance to the big screen. She was seen in films like Thikka and Aap Kaa Surroor - The Real Luv Story.

In September 2016, she appeared in Navv Inder's music video Att Tera Yaar. In October 2016, she was a contestant on Bigg Boss 10, where she finished as the 1st runner-up.

She also appeared in the web series Four More Shots Please! as Umang Singh.

Personal life
Judge is from Chandigarh. Her family consists of her mother Tanya and her elder sister Saneya. She promotes the sports nutrition company Myprotein and the fitness app Mobiefit BODY.she did her schooling from an international school in Mussoorie.

Filmography

Films

Television

Web series

References

External links 

 
 

Living people
1987 births
Actresses from Chandigarh
Female models from Chandigarh
Bigg Boss (Hindi TV series) contestants
MTV Roadies contestants
Fear Factor: Khatron Ke Khiladi participants
Indian VJs (media personalities)
Indian film actresses
Actresses in Hindi cinema
Actresses in Punjabi cinema
Actresses in Telugu cinema
Actresses in Tamil cinema
Indian television actresses
Actresses in Hindi television
Indian female models
Indian women